Go Tell Fire to the Mountain is the debut album by English band WU LYF, released on 13 June 2011. The album was released to high anticipation and the backing of NME, Stereogum, and Pitchfork.

Recording
The band had the concept for Go Tell Fire to the Mountain long before the recording process took place. Roberts states that it was written "in a narrative sense and [was approached] as a complete work rather than a bunch of songs thrown together." When searching for a place to record, the group was dissatisfied with the sound they were getting from traditional studios, leading them to settle on Saint Peter's, an old abandoned church in Ancoats, Greater Manchester. The amount of open airspace in the church allowed for a healthy dose of reverb, which is a critical part of the album's larger than life sound. Despite the media's insistence of the location's relevance to the religious theme of the band, Roberts denies it. Although the church altered the "vibe of the songs", the band asserts that Saint Peter's church sonically fit the album's needs.

Singles
"Heavy Pop" and "Concrete Gold" were released as a double A-side single prior to the album on 31 May 2010. "Dirt" was released as a radio-only promo CD in support of the album's release in June 2011. "We Bros" was released as a single from the album on 20 September 2011.

Critical reception

Go Tell Fire to the Mountain was met with "generally favorable" reviews from critics. At Metacritic, which assigns a weighted average rating out of 100 to reviews from mainstream publications, this release received an average score of 77 based on 20 reviews.

Accolades

Track listing
All songs written and composed by WU LYF.

Charts

References

2011 debut albums
WU LYF albums